Lewis B. Allyn (Louis) (July 3, 1874 – May 7, 1940, in Westfield, Massachusetts) was an American chemistry professor and influential figure in the pure food movement at the time of his murder.

He was teaching at Westfield Teachers College and contributing as a pure foods expert for McClure's magazines at the time of his shooting. His is the only unsolved murder in the history of Westfield, Massachusetts.

See also
List of unsolved murders

References

1874 births
1940 deaths
American food writers
Deaths by firearm in Massachusetts
Male murder victims
People from Huntington, Massachusetts
People murdered in Massachusetts
Unsolved murders in the United States